Flemmi is a surname. Notable people with the surname include:

 Michael Flemmi (born 1937), American police officer
 Stephen Flemmi (born 1934), American gangster 
 Vincent Flemmi (1935–1979), Italian-American gangster